Wembley South was a constituency in what was then the Borough of Wembley in Middlesex and from 1965 wholly in northwest London.  It returned one member (MP) to the House of Commons of the UK Parliament, elected by the first past the post system, returning Conservative apart from in 1945, the victory of the First Attlee ministry when it returned a Labour member.

History 

The constituency was created at the 1945 general election, and abolished at the February 1974 general election.

Boundaries
The Municipal Borough of Wembley wards of Alperton, Central, Sudbury, Sudbury Court, Tokyngton, and Wembley Park.

Members of Parliament

Elections

Elections in the 1940s

Elections in the 1950s

Elections in the 1960s

Elections in the 1970s

References

Parliamentary constituencies in London (historic)
Constituencies of the Parliament of the United Kingdom established in 1945
Constituencies of the Parliament of the United Kingdom disestablished in 1974
Politics of the London Borough of Brent